Elizabeth Strong Worthington (October 5, 1851 – October 2, 1916) was an American writer during the latter part of the 19th century. 

Her first books, When Peggy Smiled: A Love Story and The Biddy Club, were published in 1888. They were followed, in 1898, by The Little Brown Dog and How to Cook Husbands (arguably her most popular work). Her final book was The Gentle Art of Cooking Wives, published in 1900. 

She sometimes wrote under the pen name Griffith A. Nicholas.

References

External links
 
 
 
 The Gentle Art of Cooking Wives at Project Gutenberg
 How to Cook Husbands at Project Gutenberg

1916 deaths
1851 births
19th-century American writers
20th-century American writers
20th-century American women writers
19th-century American women writers